Stay the Night may refer to:

Songs
 "Stay the Night" a 2022 song by Sigala featuring Talia Mar
 "Stay the Night" (Alcazar song), 2009
 "Stay the Night" (Benjamin Orr song), 1986
 "Stay the Night" (Billy Ocean song), 1980, also covered by La Toya Jackson
 "Stay the Night" (Chicago song), 1984
 "Stay the Night" (Ghosts song), 2007
 "Stay the Night" (IMx song), 1999
 "Stay the Night" (James Blunt song), 2010
 "Stay the Night" (Millionaires song), 2010
 "Stay the Night" (Sigala and Talia Mar song), 2022
 "Stay the Night" (Zedd song), 2013, featuring Hayley Williams
 "Stay the Night", a 1983 song by Status Quo from Back to Back
 "Stay the Night", a 2000 song by 98 Degrees from Revelation
 "Stay the Night", a 1992 song by Brian McKnight from Brian McKnight
 "Stay the Night", a 2012 song by Green Day from ¡Uno!
 "Stay the Night", a 2005 song by Mariah Carey from The Emancipation of Mimi

Other uses
 Stay the Night (1992 film), a 1992 TV film featuring Fred Thompson
 Stay the Night (2022 film), a 2022 theatrical film directed by Renuka Jeyapalan
 Stay the Night, a 1978 album by Jane Olivor and its title song

See also
 "Stay for the Night", a 2005 song by Gotthard from Lipservice